The 2017–18 Swazi Premier League season was the 2017–18 season of the top level of football competition in Swaziland (since 2018 renamed to Eswatini). It began on 8 September 2017 and ended on 13 May 2018.

Standings
Final table.

See also
2018 Swazi Cup

References

Football leagues in Eswatini
Premier League
Premier League
Swaziland